The Soulsby Service Station is a historic service station in Mount Olive, Illinois. The station is located along historic U.S. Route 66 and is the oldest usable service station on the highway in Illinois. It serves as an example of the house and canopy gas station design.

Henry Soulsby built the station in 1926 after an injury forced him to leave the mining industry and operated it along with his children Russell and Ola Soulsby. His son Russell, a World War II naval communications technician, operated a radio and TV repair business out of the station as Interstate 55 diverted highway traffic away from the site in the late 1950s.

The station stopped pumping gas in 1991 and closed in 1993; plans currently exist to reopen it as a museum.

References

Transport infrastructure completed in 1926
Transportation buildings and structures in Macoupin County, Illinois
Buildings and structures on U.S. Route 66
Retail buildings in Illinois
Gas stations on the National Register of Historic Places in Illinois
National Register of Historic Places in Macoupin County, Illinois